The A-train is a  hybrid rail (light rail with some features similar to commuter rail) line in Denton County, Texas, United States. It is the fourth-busiest commuter rail line in Texas and thirty-first in the United States. It runs parallel to Interstate 35E between Denton and Carrollton and acts as an extension with the Dallas Area Rapid Transit Green Line at Trinity Mills Station in Carrollton. It is operated by First Transit under the authority of the Denton County Transportation Authority (DCTA) and serves Denton County. It opened on June 20, 2011.

History 
The right of way was established by the Missouri–Kansas–Texas Railroad.  of the disused line was purchased by the city of Denton in 1993, with a rail trail opening in 2001.

A formal Alternatives Analysis study conducted in 2004–2005, which included extensive community and citizen involvement, identified the proposed rail line as the best and most cost-effective mobility solution for Denton County and the region. It cited the impacts of projected population growth, growing safety, traffic congestion and air quality concerns, as well as the need to improve access to Denton County's vital health care facilities and three major college and university campuses.

In May 2005, the DCTA Board of Directors approved the study's recommendation to construct the rail alignment on east side of I-35E using an existing railroad corridor. The DCTA worked closely with the Federal Transit Administration (FTA) to meet the Federal and local regulatory requirements. In March 2008, the DCTA Board of Directors approved the Final Environmental Impact Determination that detailed the proposed measures to mitigate the environmental impacts of the rail project and the Regional Transportation Council approved funding of in August 2008. Federal funds were not used in the construction of the rail link.

On April 4, 2011, the DCTA began tests of railcars, communications systems and signals on track between Carrollton and Lewisville Lake, with tests on the remainder of the route projected to begin later in the month, though this date was later pushed back to mid-May.

The A-train was opened on June 20, 2011, with celebrations at five train stations.

First Transit signed an agreement with the DCTA on July 20, 2016, to operate the A-train from October 1, 2016. The contract is for nine years with five additional option years.

Future 
The North Central Texas Council of Governments Mobility 2045 plan calls for the A-train to be extended south to interchange with the DART Silver Line. , DCTA is in discussions with DART to extend the A-train to Downtown Carrollton as part of an agreement in which DCTA would host a DART Silver Line maintenance center at the existing A-Train Operations and
Maintenance Facility, including track upgrades and a new A-train station at Downtown Carrollton.

Operation

Fares 
Fares are fully integrated with the rest of the DCTA system, with single rides costing $1.50. Two free transit zones exist on the system: between Downtown Denton Transit Center and MedPark, as well as Hebron Station to Trinity Mills.

Services 
Since September 7, 2021, the A-train operates with a 30 minute headway during rush hours and interpeak every weekday, while on Saturdays the service runs every 60 minutes. There is no service on Sundays and major holidays. Interchanges with the DART Green Line are irregularly timed.

Stations 
All stations have a park and ride lot and are fully accessible.

Rolling stock 
DCTA placed an order for 11 Stadler GTW 2/6 DMUs in 2010. The first of the new trains were delivered in late 2011 for testing prior to their entry into service. The full order was fulfilled by August 2012, and in September 2012 the new units replaced the Budd DMUs leased from TRE. The line uses diesel-electric hybrid motive power.

The A-Train began operations using 10 Budd RDC-1s leased from Trinity Railway Express, which were used until DCTA's own purpose-built fleet was delivered.

References

External links 

Passenger rail transportation in Texas
Commuter rail in the United States
Denton County Transportation Authority
Railway lines opened in 2011
2011 establishments in Texas